The Quaid-e-Azam Trophy is a domestic first-class cricket competition in Pakistan. With few exceptions, it has been staged annually since it was first played during the 1953–54 season. Domestic cricket in Pakistan has undergone many reorganisations, with the number of teams and matches in the Quaid-e-Azam Trophy changing regularly. Since the 2019–20 season it has been contested by six regional teams, having previously been variously contested by associations or departments, or a combination of the two.

History
Named after Muhammad Ali Jinnah, the founder of Pakistan, who was known as "Quaid-e-Azam" (Great Leader), the trophy was introduced in the 1953–54 season to help the selectors pick the squad for Pakistan's Test tour of England in 1954. Five regional and two departmental teams competed in the first competition: Bahawalpur, Punjab, Karachi, North-West Frontier Province, Sindh, Combined Services and Pakistan Railways.

The Quaid-e-Azam Trophy has been contested by a variety of teams representing regional cricket associations and departments. The departmental teams were run by companies, institutions and government departments, and offered employment for their players. In most seasons up to 2019 a mixture of the two competed together, but on many occasions the competition has been contested exclusively by regional or departmental teams. Due to their strength in depth, several regional associations have entered multiple teams, starting in 1956–57 when Karachi, Punjab and East Pakistan each had two teams. The competition's format has seldom remained unchanged from one season to the next. It was a knockout tournament for the first two seasons, and again in 1959–60, from 1963–64 to 1968–69, and from 1970–71 to 1978–79. At other times it has been contested in one or more round robin groups with another group stage, knockout or single final match between the top sides in each group, and as a two division league system with a knockout and/or final and promotion and relegation. Even when the system remained constant, the composition of teams from the regions and departments often changed. Karachi teams have won the trophy 20 times, the most by any team.

In a major overhaul of domestic cricket in Pakistan, ahead of the 2019–20 season the Pakistan Cricket Board announced a new structure which removed the traditional regions and departments, with six newly formed regional teams contesting the Quaid-e-Azam Trophy. In January 2023, the Pakistan Cricket Board, adverting to "the wrong policies of the past four seasons", announced that the PCB constitution had been changed. Pakistan domestic cricket would revert to what the PCB called its "tried, tested and winning cricket model and structure", and 16 regional cricket associations would compete in the 2023–24 Quaid-e-Azam Trophy.

Structure since 2019–20
On 31 August 2019, the PCB introduced a new structure of the tournament, in which six newly formed regional teams will play a total of thirty-one matches, each team playing ten matches. The teams competing are Balochistan, Central Punjab, Khyber Pakhtunkhwa, Northern, Sindh and Southern Punjab. On 3 September 2019, the PCB confirmed all of the squads for the tournament.

The PCB also updated the playing conditions for the tournament, including removing the mandatory coin toss and the possibility of extending the final by an extra day, if needed. The visiting team's captain will have the choice to bowl first if they wish. If not, then the coin toss will take place as before. This practice has been used in England since the 2016 County Championship season. If the final ends in a draw, the winner will be declared on the basis of a first innings lead. However, if the first innings for both teams have not been completed, an extra day will be used. In the event that both teams do not complete their first innings, they will both be declared the winners of the tournament.

Teams
Details of each team are set out below.

 Each team's principal grounds are listed here. For a full list, see list of cricket grounds in Pakistan.

Team Results

 Notes
 W = Winner; 
 R = Runner-up;
 (x) = End of league games table position;

Points system
Points are awarded at the conclusion of each match during the season.

Match Points:
 Outright Win: 16
 Draw: 5
 Tied: 8
 Abandoned: 5

Bonus Points: 
 Winning the match after follow-on: 2
 Win with an innings margin: 1
 Saving the match after follow-on: 1

Batting Points for First Innings (100 overs)
 200 Runs: 1
 250 Runs: 2
 300 Runs: 3
 350 Runs: 4
 400 Runs: 5

Bowling Points for First Innings (100 overs)
A: Over-Based Points System
 3 Wickets: 1
 6 Wickets: 2
 8 Wickets: 3. 
B: All-Out Bonus Points
 200 or Less: 3
 250 or Less: 2
 300 or Less: 1

Winners and competition details

Multiple winners
Karachi teams have had the most success, winning the Quaid-e-Azam Trophy 20 times. Pakistan International Airlines (PIA) are next with seven wins, followed by National Bank with five. Lahore teams, United Bank, and Sui Northern Gas Pipelines Limited (SNGPL) have four wins each; Habib Bank has 3; and Bahawalpur, Peshawar, Punjab, Railways, Sialkot and Central Punjab (one shared) each have two.

Records
Some team and individual records in the Quaid-e-Azam Trophy are listed in the table below:

 – This was a world record partnership for the second wicket in first-class cricket.

Broadcasters

See also

 Pakistan Cup
 National T20 Cup
 Pakistan Super League
 Kashmir Premier League (Pakistan)

Notes

References

Other sources
 Wisden Cricketers' Almanack 1955 to current

 
Pakistani domestic cricket competitions
Professional sports leagues in Pakistan
Recurring sporting events established in 1953
Sports leagues established in 1953
1953 establishments in Pakistan
First-class cricket competitions
Memorials to Muhammad Ali Jinnah